The 2014 Trans-Am Series was the 46th running of the Sports Car Club of America's Trans-Am Series. It began March 2, 2014. The series featured TA, TA2, and TA3 groups, with TA3 split into two sub-groups. TA3-International was for select cars meeting SCCA GT-2 class rules, while TA3-American Muscle was for current-generation "pony cars" meeting NASA's American Iron class specifications.

In the main TA class, the top four championship positions as well as all race victories were taken by drivers competing in Chevrolet Corvettes. It was won by defending champion Doug Peterson, who won five races over the course of the season. Peterson won the championship by 33 points ahead of 2012 champion Simon Gregg, who finished every race with a top-five finish without winning a race. One point further behind in third place was Amy Ruman, who won races at New Jersey Motorsports Park and Daytona International Speedway; Ruman's latter victory ensured she became the first woman to claim a solo overall victory in a professional automobile race at Daytona. Other victories were taken by drivers who did not contest the whole season; Paul Fix won successive races at Lime Rock and Virginia International Raceway, while R. J. López and Ron Fellows won on one-off appearances at Homestead and Canadian Tire Motorsport Park respectively.

Cameron Lawrence won a second successive TA2 title, winning seven races at the wheel of a Chevrolet Camaro, and latterly in the season, a Dodge Challenger. Cameron Lawrence finished 21 points clear of Adam Andretti, a three-time race winner at the wheel of a Camaro (and the first member of the famous Andretti family to ever compete in the Trans Am Series). Third place went to the only other winner in the class, Ron Keith, who won at Brainerd. TA3-International class honors went to Jason Berkeley, a three-time race winner during the season. He won the class by six points ahead of Norman Betts, who won at Canadian Tire Motorsport Park. A further eight points behind in third place was Russ Snow, who won races at Road Atlanta and Daytona. Other drivers to win races were Lee Saunders, who won at Sebring and Mid-Ohio, while single race wins were taken by Jerry Greene (Brainerd), Clint Sawinski (Road America) and Michael Camus (Homestead).

Six wins in the final seven races was enough to give Ernie Francis Jr. the class title in TA3-International. Francis finished 50 points clear of his nearest rival in class, Chuck Cassaro. Todd Napieralski finished a further four points behind in third place, having won at Road Atlanta and Brainerd. The only other winners in class were Dean Martin, who won the opening two Floridian races at Sebring and Homestead, and Joe Chan, who won at Canadian Tire Motorsport Park. In the Manufacturers' Championships, Chevrolet won all four titles on offer.

Schedule
The 2014 schedule was announced January 1, 2014.

Calendar and results

Series development
It was announced on January 10, 2014, that Hoosier would become the control tire supplier for Trans-Am.

Driver standings

TA

TA2

TA3

International

American Muscle

References

External links

Trans-Am Series
TransAm